Live at the Palace 2008 is the first DVD release from Canadian rock band Three Days Grace. Three Days Grace dedicated this DVD, in loving memory, to their manager and friend Stuart Sobol. The DVD was originally released as a Best Buy exclusive in August 2008, but soon became available at other retailers.

Background
The DVD was filmed at The Palace of Auburn Hills in Michigan and captures the explosive energy of the band's live performance and the enthusiasm of the sold-out crowd. The DVD also contains exclusive behind-the-scenes footage that allows fans the opportunity to get up-close and personal with the band.

Track listing

The concert film includes exclusive behind-the-scene footage featuring members of the band.

Credits
Credits for Live at the Place 2008 adapted from AllMusic.

Musicians

 Adam Gontier – lead vocals, rhythm guitar
 Neil Sanderson – drums, backing vocals
 Brad Walst – bass guitar, backing vocals
 Barry Stock – lead guitar

Production
 Michael Drumm – director, producer, editor
 Stuart Sobol, Nicki Loranger – executive producers, management
 Stacy Kanter, Dan Mackta – co-executive producers
 Michael Tabasco – A&R
 Michael Spencer – editor
 Jay Chapman – producer
 Howard Benson – audio producer
 Mike Plotnikoff – mixer
 Harsukazu Inagaki, Brendan Dekora – assistant engineers
 Paul Decarli – digital editing
 Jason McDaniel, JP Manza – interstitial audio mixing, soundtrack editing	
 Timothy Powell – live audio recording producer and engineer

 Dan Glomski, Darren Styles, Nick Smith – audio record crew
 Mike Filsinger – lighting director
 David Rhoades – The Palace of Auburn Hills: broadcast facilities coordinator
 Dan Brown – chief engineer
 Tom Step – color correction
 Jim Sobczak – technical director
 Gary Mclenon, Tony Chrobak, Mark Gomez, Doug Maguire, Matt Regimbal, Steve Biondo, Kevin Bovee – camera
 Dave McNutt – jib operator 
 Chris Berkenkamp, Jay Chapman – B-roll camera
 Paul Culler, Scott Edeid – engineer in charge
 Bob Stapleton, Kyle Clements, Victor Navarro, Keith Anderson – video technicians
 Mark Gavras – video tape recorder
 Eddie Bush – A1
 Brian Porter – A2
 Kirk Erdmann Jr. – dolly grip
 Morgan Rhoades, Steven Marleau, Anthony Chrobak, Kevin Lukas – utility
 Christine Ramsey – production assistant
 Peter Kimball – mobile video production facility
 Kristen Pierson – photography

Charts

References

Three Days Grace video albums
2008 video albums